Local elections were held in the province of Quezon on May 10, 2010, as part of the 2010 general election. Voters will select candidates for all local positions: a town mayor, vice mayor and town councilors, as well as members of the Sangguniang Panlalawigan, the vice-governor, governor and representatives for the four districts of Quezon.

Incumbent candidates are italicized.

Provincial elections

Gubernatorial election 
Incumbent governor Rafael Nantes is running for his second term. He will face former vice governor David Suarez.

Vice Gubernatorial election 
Incumbent vice governor Carlos Portes is running for his second term.

Provincial board elections

1st District 

|-
| colspan="5" style="background:black;" |

2nd District 

 
|-
| colspan="5" style="background:black;" |

3rd District 

|-
| colspan="5" style="background:black;" |

4th District 

 
|-
| colspan="5" style="background:black;" |

Congressional elections

1st District 
Incumbent representative Mark Enverga is running for his second term.

2nd District

3rd District 
Incumbent representative Danilo Suarez will face former governor Eduardo Rodriguez.

4th District 
Incumbent representative Lorenzo Tañada III is running unopposed.

Lucena local elections

Mayoral election

Vice Mayoral election

Sources 
Philippines 2010 Election Results – Quezon

2010 Philippine local elections
Elections in Quezon
Politics of Quezon
2010 elections in Calabarzon